Berkowo  is a village in the administrative district of Gmina Wydminy, within Giżycko County, Warmian-Masurian Voivodeship, in northern Poland.

The village has a population of 100.

References

Berkowo